Fichman is a surname, and may refer to:

 Jacob Fichman, Romania-born Israeli poet, essayist, and literary critic 
 Jacobo Fijman (Fikhman), Argentine poet
 Mal Fichman, minor league baseball manager
 Niv Fichman, Canadian film producer and director
 Sharon Fichman (born 1990), Canadian/Israeli tennis player

Jewish surnames
Germanic-language surnames